Tritonium submuricatum is a species of sea snail, a marine gastropod mollusk in the family Cancellariidae, the nutmeg snails.

As the genus name Tritonium is no longer accepted, this species name has become a "species inquirenda".

Description

Distribution

References

Cancellariidae
Gastropods described in 1862